COICA may refer to:
Coordinator of Indigenous Organizations of the Amazon River Basin, Peruvian organization that coordinates national Amazonian indigenous organizations
Combating Online Infringement and Counterfeits Act, proposed legislation in the United States Senate that allows the blocking the domain names of web sites accused of piracy